Snaptube is a free Android app that downloads video, audio and also works as a social media aggregator. It provides video resolutions in a range of 144p, 720p, 1080p HD, 2K HD, 4K HD and audio formats inn MP3 and M4A. With Snaptube, users can look for content on all their platforms (Facebook, Instagram, TikTok and all others) without using numerous apps. As of June 2020, the application is used by over 100 million users.

In 2019, Upstream warned that users are served invisible ads without their knowledge that run silently on the device, allowing the app maker to generate ad revenue at the expense of churning up a user's mobile data and battery power. According to Upstream, their Secure-D platform detected and blocked "more than 70 million suspicious mobile transaction requests" from SnapTube installs on 4.4 million devices.

After Google pulled the application from The  Play Store, Snaptube blamed a third-party software development kit called Mango SDK, with the developer claiming to have removed the offending SDK. The company took immediate action and released an update which took Mango SDK off subsequent versions.

Mango was also found in other apps for fraud behaviors. According to Upstream, this third-party SDK downloads additional components from a central server to engage in this fraudulent ad activity and uses chains of redirection and obfuscation to hide its activity.

References

External Links 
 
2014 software
Mobile applications